Ojakəran (also, Odzhakachan and Ozhakeran) is a village and municipality in the Astara Rayon of Azerbaijan.  It has a population of 1,750.

References

 

populated places in Astara District